Sergio Vartolo (born in Bologna in 1944) is an Italian harpsichordist, organist, musicologist and conductor; in the past he was also active as a countertenor. In 1996 he was appointed maestro de capella of the Cappella Musicale di San Petronio di Bologna founded in 1436. He has an extensive discography, both as a harpsichordist - the complete works of Girolamo Frescobaldi, and as a conductor - particularly works by Giovanni Paolo Colonna and Giacomo Antonio Perti associated with San Petronio, but also operas by Claudio Monteverdi and others.

References

Italian harpsichordists

Living people

Year of birth missing (living people)